Forestation is either growing existing forests (proforestation) or establishing forest growth on areas that either had forest or lacked it naturally. In the first case, the process is called reforestation, or reafforestation while the second is called afforestation.

Massive afforestation has been proposed as a method to mitigate climate change, though its effectiveness is limited by the albedo effect.

References

Forestry